Empetrum eamesii, common name purple crowberry, is a plant native to eastern Canada and the northeastern United States. It has been reported from sand dunes, rocky outcrops, and alpine heath in Québec, Nova Scotia, Prince Edward Island, Maine, New Hampshire, Vermont, New York State, the Upper Peninsula of Michigan, Minnesota (Cook County), Newfoundland & Labrador and St. Pierre & Miquelon.

All the US and some of the Canadian material belongs to Empetrum eamesii subsp. atropurpureum (Fernald & Wiegand) D.Löve which has been regarded as a separate species by some authorities but not others.

Empetrum eamesii is a low-lying, evergreen shrub with prostrate stems, forming a mat on the ground. Leaves are alternate or in whorls. Flowers are solitary  near the tips of branches, each with 3 white petals. Fruits are spherical, pink or red in subsp. earnsii, purple to reddish-purple in subsp. atropurpureum.

References 

eamesii
Flora of Eastern Canada
Flora of the Northeastern United States
Flora of Minnesota
Plants described in 1913
Flora without expected TNC conservation status